This list includes the transfers that took place in Hong Kong football in summer of 2014.

Hong Kong First Division League

Biu Chun Rangers

In:

Out:

Citizen

In:

Out:

Eastern

In:

Out:

South China

In:

Out:

Southern

In:

Out:

Sun Pegasus

In:

Out:

Yokohama FC Hong Kong

In:

Out:

References

Transfers
2014
Hong Kong